Yelan (Yalan) is a rural locality (a village) in Ishlinsky Selsoviet, Beloretsky District, Bashkortostan, Russia. The population was five as of 2010. There are three streets.

Geography 
Yelan is located 62 km west of Beloretsk (the district's administrative centre) by road. Bzyak is the nearest rural locality.

References 

Rural localities in Beloretsky District